The Hanriot H.33 was a French biplane 2-seat fighter aircraft built in 1926, derived from the Hanriot H.31. It was not successful and only one prototype was completed.

Specifications

References

Single-engined tractor aircraft
Biplanes
1920s French fighter aircraft
H.033